"Riddles Wisely Expounded" is a traditional English song, dating at least to 1450. It is Child Ballad 1 and Roud 161, and exists in several variants. The first known tune was attached to it in 1719. The title "Riddles Wisely Expounded" was given by Francis James Child and seems derived from the seventeenth century broadside version "A Noble Riddle Wisely Expounded".

Origins and Context 
The motif of riddling in folklore is very ancient, the stories of Oedipus and Samson giving two early examples. The particular form used here matches the folktale Aarne-Thompson type 875 The Clever Girl where a woman wins a husband by her clever answers to riddles. Other tales of this type include What Is the Fastest Thing in the World? and The Wise Little Girl. There are strong parallels with ballads in other languages, with many German, and Scottish and Irish Gaelic versions known to exist. There is also significant crossover with other popular English language ballads, such as The Two Sisters (Child 10) and The False Knight on the Road (Child 3) and The Elfin Knight (Child 2).

Inter diabolus et virgo, "between the devil and the maiden" (c1450) 
In the earliest surviving version of the song, the "foul fiend" proposes to abduct a maiden unless she can answer a series of riddles. The woman prays to Jesus for wisdom, and answers the riddles correctly.

First two verses 
Wol ye here a wonder thynge ("Will you hear a wondrous story,)

Betwyxt a mayd and the fovle fende? (Between a maid and the foul fiend (Devil)?")

Thys spake the fend to the mayd: (Thus spoke the fiend (Devil) to the maid:)

'Beleue on me, mayd, to day. ("Believe on me, maid, today.")

Some riddles 
'What ys hyer than ys [the] tre? ("What is higher than is the tree?)

What ys dypper than ys the see? (What is deeper than is the sea?")

'What ys scharpper than ys the thorne? ("What is sharper than is the thorn?)

What ys loder than ys the horne? (What is louder than is the horn?")

'What [ys] longger than ys the way? ("What is longer(broader) than is the way?)

What is rader than ys the day? (What is redder than is the day?)

Some answers 
'Hewene ys heyer than ys the tre, ("Heaven is higher than is the tree)

Helle ys dypper than ys the see. (Hell is deeper than is the sea.)

'Hongyr ys scharpper than [ys] the thorne, ("Hunger is sharper than is the thorn,)

Thonder ys lodder than ys the horne. (Thunder is louder than is the horn.)

'Loukynge ys longer than ys the way, (Looking is longer(broader) than is the way,)

Syn ys rader than ys the day. (Sin is redder than is the day.)

"A Noble Riddle Wisely Expounded" 
In a seventeenth century version entitled "A Noble Riddle Wisely Expounded", the words of each verse are interspersed with a chorus phrase "lay the bent to the bonny broom". A. L. Lloyd  euphemistically describes this as a phrase of "physiological significance", explaining that the word "bent" means a horn. "Broom" most likely refers to the flowering shrub. This version is very similar to The Two Sisters (Child 10).'If thou canst answer me questions three,

Lay the bent to the bonny broom

This very day will I marry thee.'

Fa la la la, fa la la la ra reIn later versions, including this one, a knight puts a woman to test before he marries her (sometimes after seducing her); the woman knows the answers, and wins the marriage. In other versions, a devil disguised as a knight tries to carry the woman off.

The riddles vary, but typical ones include:
What is longer than the way? -- love
What is deeper than the sea? -- hell
What is louder than the horn?  -- thunder
What is sharper than a thorn? -- hunger
What is whiter than milk? -- snow
What is softer than silk? -- down
What is worse than woman was? -- the devil

Recent versions and traditional recordings 

The most commonly found traditional version in recent times, usually entitled "Ninety-nine and ninety", begins roughly as follows:Now you must answer my questions nine

Sing ninety-nine and ninety,

Or you aren't God's you are one of mine

And who is the weaver's bonny.

What is whiter than milk?

Sing ninety-nine and ninety;

And what is softer than silk?

And who is the weaver's bonny.Traditional recordings of this version have been made several times in the twentieth century. American recordings include those performed by the Appalachian traditional singer Texas Gladden (recorded by Alan and Elizabeth Lomax in 1941) Nancy Philley of Fayetteville, Arkansas (1963) and Alfreda Peel of Salem, Virginia (1932). Jeff Wesley of Whittlebury, Northamptonshire, England (1988) sang a very similar version, suggesting that this popular version came from England relatively recently.

Popular versions

Recordings

Modern literary retellings include Juniper, Gentian, and Rosemary by Pamela Dean and "A Diorama of the Infernal Regions, or the Devil's Ninth Question," by Andy Duncan.

See also
List of the Child Ballads
The Fause Knight Upon the Road
The Elfin Knight
Proud Lady Margaret
The Riddle Song

References

Further reading
 Niles, John Jacob, Ron Pen, and WILLIAM BARSS. "Riddles Wisely Expounded (Child No. 1)." In The Ballad Book of John Jacob Niles, 1-10. Lexington, Kentucky: University Press of Kentucky, 2000. doi:10.2307/j.ctt130jnj1.6.

External links
Riddles Wisely Expounded with 18th- and 19th-century melodies, and text to "Inter diabolus et virgo"

Child Ballads
Traditional music